Game Plan for Disaster is the 76th title of the Hardy Boys Mystery Stories, written by Franklin W. Dixon.  It was published by Wanderer Books in 1982.

Plot summary

Frank and Joe Hardy are drawn into a tangled web of danger when they are called in to investigate mysterious accidents plaguing a star college football quarterback. 

The Hardy Boys books
1982 American novels
1982 children's books
American football books